The Women's marathon  event for the 2012 Summer Paralympics took place at the London Olympic Stadium on 9 September. There is only one classification for this event: T54, for wheelchair athletes.

Results

T54

References

Athletics at the 2012 Summer Paralympics
Summer Paralympics
Marathons at the Paralympics
2012 Summer Paralympics
2012 in women's athletics
Women's sport in London